Edward Harvey Sprague (June 8, 1848 – December 23, 1930) was a member of the Wisconsin State Assembly.

Biography
Sprague was born on June 8, 1848 in Waterloo, Grant County, Wisconsin. He graduated from what is now the University of Wisconsin–Platteville in 1869 and the University of Wisconsin Law School in 1878. He married Linda J. Williams in 1871. Sprague died of heart failure in Milwaukee on December 23, 1930.

Career
Sprague was elected to the Assembly in 1906. Other positions he held include District Attorney of Walworth County, Wisconsin. He was a Republican.

Legacy
The Sprague Theatre in Elkhorn, Wisconsin was named after Sprague.

References

External links
The Political Graveyard
 

People from Grant County, Wisconsin
People from Walworth County, Wisconsin
Republican Party members of the Wisconsin State Assembly
District attorneys in Wisconsin
University of Wisconsin–Platteville alumni
University of Wisconsin Law School alumni
1848 births
1930 deaths
Burials in Wisconsin